Area code 284 is the telephone area code in the North American Numbering Plan (NANP) for the British Virgin Islands (BVI). The numbering plan area (NPA) was created in a split of area code 809 on 1 October 1997, when a permissive dialing period existed until 30 September 1998.

Within the British Virgin Islands, the seven digits are dialed for local calls. For calls from other NANP countries to the British Virgin Islands, the dialing sequence is 1 NPA-XXX-XXXX, where 1 is the national trunk access code.

One ring scam
The 284 area code has been linked to a form of telephone fraud known as the "one ring scam". The person perpetuating the scam calls the victim via a robodialer or similar means, sometimes at odd hours of the night and then hangs up when the phone is answered, with the hope that the victim  will be curious enough to call the number back. When the victim does this, an automatic $19.95 international call fee is charged to their account as well as $9.00/min thereafter. Similar scams have been linked to Grenada (area code 473), Antigua (area code 268), Jamaica (area codes 876 and 658) and the Dominican Republic (area code 809).

See also
List of NANP area codes
Area codes in the Caribbean
Telephone numbers in the United Kingdom

References

External links
North American Numbering Plan Administrator

Telecommunications in the British Virgin Islands
284
Communications in the British Virgin Islands